Albert Jordan, or Albert H. Jordan (c. 1821 – 1872), was an American architect known primarily for his work in Detroit, Michigan.

Jordan was born in England around 1821. In 1852 he followed his brother, Octavius Jordan, also an architect, to the United States. Joining his brother in Hartford, he became a partner in his firm, O. & A. Jordan. That same year he traveled to Detroit to open a western office, with Octavius remaining in Hartford. The brothers' partnership was dissolved in 1854, with Albert Jordan remaining in Detroit.

Jordan remained in independent practice until 1856. That year he made James Anderson, one of his draftsmen, a partner. The firm of Jordan & Anderson lasted until 1861, when Jordan departed for San Francisco. He was pushed there under the economic pressure of the Civil War, which limited architectural opportunities in Detroit. Jordan remained in San Francisco for a decade, when he left again, this time for Portland. He continued to practice architecture, and died in that city in 1872.

The firm of Jordan & Anderson was selected in 1861 as the architects of the new Detroit City Hall. Plans were drawn, but construction did not move ahead. When this now-demolished building went forward in 1867, James Anderson was the sole architect.

Architectural works
O. & A. Jordan, 1852-1854:
 1853 - Fort Street Presbyterian Church, 631 W Fort St, Detroit, Michigan
 1854 - Jefferson Avenue Presbyterian Church, 1301 E Jefferson Ave, Detroit, Michigan
 Demolished
Albert Jordan, 1854-1856:
 1854 - First Congregational Church, Fort & Wayne Sts, Detroit, Michigan
 Demolished
 1855 - All Saints' Anglican Church, 330 City Hall Sq. W., Windsor, Ontario
 1855 - Essex County Courthouse (Mackenzie Hall), 3277 Sandwich St W, Windsor, Ontario
 1855 - First Presbyterian Church, Farmer & State Sts, Detroit, Michigan
 Demolished
 1856 - Central Public School, 350 City Hall Sq W, Windsor, Ontario
 Later City Hall, demolished
 1856 - Chapel, Elmwood Cemetery, Detroit, Michigan
Jordan & Anderson, 1856-1861:
 1856 - Chemical Laboratory, University of Michigan, Ann Arbor, Michigan
 Demolished
 1856 - St. Luke's Episcopal Church, 120 N Huron St, Ypsilanti, Michigan
 1857 - Russell House, 660 Woodward Ave, Detroit, Michigan
 Once Detroit's most expensive hotel. Demolished.
 1857 - Union School, 210 W Cross St, Ypsilanti, Michigan
 Demolished
 1858 - Henry P. Baldwin House, 341 Woodward Ave, Detroit, Michigan
 Demolished
 1858 - Zachariah Chandler House, W Fort & 2nd Sts, Detroit, Michigan
 Demolished
 1860 - St. John's Episcopal Church, 2326 Woodward Ave, Detroit, Michigan
 1860 - St. Patrick's R. C. Church, 124 Adelaide St, Detroit, Michigan
 Burned in 1993
 1861 - Law Building (Haven Hall), University of Michigan, Ann Arbor, Michigan
 Demolished
Albert H. Jordan, 1861-1872:
 1863 - Second M. E. Church, 657 Howard St, San Francisco, California
 Also known as the Howard Street Church, demolished
 1865 - St. Matthew's Episcopal Church, 1 S El Camino Real, San Mateo, California
 Destroyed in 1906
 1866 - Trinity Episcopal Church, 384 Post St, San Francisco, California
 Demolished
 1871 - Trinity Episcopal Church, SW 6th & Oak Sts, Portland, Oregon
 Burned in 1902

References

1820s births
1872 deaths
Year of birth missing
Architects from California
Architects from Detroit
Architects from Portland, Oregon
American ecclesiastical architects
Gothic Revival architects